Anne Briand (born 2 June 1968, in Mulhouse) is a former French biathlete. She belonged to the world's best biathletes in the early 1990s. At the 1992 Olympics in Albertville, the first time this competition was introduced at the olympic level she won a gold medal with the French relay team. In 1995 she won the world title in the sprint event and also won the overall World Cup.

References
IBU Profile

1968 births
Living people
French female biathletes
Olympic gold medalists for France
Olympic silver medalists for France
Olympic bronze medalists for France
Biathletes at the 1992 Winter Olympics
Biathletes at the 1994 Winter Olympics
Olympic medalists in biathlon
Biathlon World Championships medalists
Medalists at the 1992 Winter Olympics
Medalists at the 1994 Winter Olympics
Olympic biathletes of France
Sportspeople from Mulhouse
20th-century French women